The Royal Households of the United Kingdom consists of royal officials and the supporting staff of the British Royal Family, as well as the Royal Household which supports the Sovereign. Each member of the Royal Family who undertakes public duties has his own separate Household.

King George V (1865–1936) was created Duke of York in 1892, and received a separate household together with his brother. Courtiers appointed to assist the Prince George of Wales until that year had been part of his parents´ household. After his marriage to Princess Mary of Teck in 1893 they shared the Household of the Duke and Duchess of York.

On the accession of his father, King Edward VII in January 1901, George automatically inherited the dukedom of Cornwall and was known as the Duke of Cornwall and York until the following November, when he was appointed Prince of Wales. From 1901 until his accession in 1910 he and his wife shared the Household of the Prince and Princess of Wales, but several appointments were to either the Prince or the Princess (e.g. they each had separate Lords Chamberlain and Private Secretaries).

When he became King, his household was known as the Household of the Sovereign 1910–1936.

Queen Mary (1867–1953) received a separate household upon her husband's accession, the Household of the Queen. From 1936, it was known as the Household of Queen Mary.

Household of the Duke of York 1892–1893 and Household of the Duke and Duchess of York 1893–1901

Controller and Treasurer
1892–1901: Major General Sir Francis Walter de Winton, GCMG, CB

Household of the Prince and Princess of Wales 1901–1910

Comptroller and Treasurer
1901–?: Lieutenant-Colonel the Hon. Sir William H. P. Carington, KCVO, CB

Private Secretary to the Prince of Wales
1901–1910: Lieutenant-Colonel Sir Arthur Bigge, GCVO, KCB, KCSI, KCMG, ISO (later Baron Stamfordham)

Lords of the Bedchamber to the Prince of Wales
1901–?: Beilby Lawley, 3rd Baron Wenlock, GCSI, GCIE, KCB
1901–1907: Charles Cavendish, 3rd Baron Chesham, KCB
1908–1910: Luke White, 3rd Baron Annaly

Master of the Stables
1901–1910: Captain the Hon. William Charles Wentworth-FitzWilliam

Equerries to the Prince of Wales
1901–?: Commander Sir Charles L. Cust, Bart., CMG, MVO, Royal Navy
1901–1910: the Hon. Derek V. G. Keppel, CMG, CIE, MVO, VD
1901–?: Captain the Viscount Crichton, DSO
1901–1910: Captain Bryan G. Godfrey-Faussett, CMG, MVO, Royal Navy

Extra Equerries to the Prince of Wales
1901–1910: Captain Rosslyn Erskine-Wemyss, MVO, Royal Navy
1901–?: Major James Henry Bor, CMG, Royal Marine Artillery
1901–1910: Captain the Hon. William Charles Wentworth-FitzWilliam

Groom of the bedchamber to the Prince of Wales
1902–1910: Edward William Wallington, CMG

Lord Chamberlain to the Princess of Wales
1901–1910: Anthony Ashley-Cooper, 9th Earl of Shaftesbury, KCVO

Private Secretary to the Princess of Wales
1901–1910: Honourable Alexander Nelson Hood

Equerry to the Princess of Wales
1901–?: Frank Dugdale, Esq.

Ladies of the Bedchamber to the Princess of Wales
1901–1910: Mabell Ogilvy, Countess of Airlie
1901–1902: Ida Frances Bridgeman, Countess of Bradford
1902–1903: Mary Cochrane-Baillie, Baroness Lamington

Women of the Bedchamber to the Princess of Wales
1901–?: Lady Eva Dugdale
1901–?: Lady Mary Forbes-Trefusis

Extra Women of the Bedchamber to the Princess of Wales
1901–?: Lady Katharine Coke

Domestic Chaplain
1901–1910: Reverend Canon John Neale Dalton, CVO, CMG

Household of King George V 1910–1936

Master of the Horse
1910–1915: Bernard Forbes, 8th Earl of Granard, KP, GCVO
1915–1922: Edwyn Scudamore-Stanhope, 10th Earl of Chesterfield, KG, GCVO
1922–1924: Thomas Thynne, 5th Marquess of Bath, KG, CB
1924–1936: Bernard Forbes, 8th Earl of Granard, KP, GCVO

Lord Steward
1910–1915: Edwyn Scudamore-Stanhope, 10th Earl of Chesterfield, KG, GCVO
1915–1922: Horace Farquhar, Viscount Farquhar, GCB, GCVO (later Earl Farquhar)
1922–1936: Anthony Ashley-Cooper, 9th Earl of Shaftesbury, KP, GCVO, CBE

Lord Chamberlain
1910–1912: Charles Spencer, 6th Earl Spencer, GCVO
1912–1921: William Mansfield, 1st Viscount Sandhurst, GCSI, GCIE, GCVO
1921–1922: John Stewart-Murray, 8th Duke of Atholl, KT, GCVO, CB
1922–1936: Rowland Baring, 2nd Earl of Cromer, GCB, GCIE, GCVO

Master of the Household
1910–1912: Lieutenant-Colonel Sir Charles Arthur Frederick, GCVO, KCB
1912–1936: Lieutenant-Colonel the Hon. Sir Derek W. G. Keppel, GCVO, KCB, CMG, CIE, VD

Deputy Master of the Household
1910–1912: the Hon. Sir Derek W. G. Keppe, KCVO, CMG, CIE, VDl

Crown Equerry
1910–1924: Captain the Hon. Sir William Charles Wentworth-FitzWilliam, GCVO

Equerries
1910–1936: Captain Sir Bryan G. Godfrey-Faussett, GCVO, CMG, Royal Navy
1927–? : Colonel George Camborne Beauclerk Paynter, CMG, DSO

Household of Queen Mary 1910–1953

Lord Chamberlain to the Queen
1910–1922: Anthony Ashley-Cooper, 9th Earl of Shaftesbury, KP, KCVO, CBE
1922–1947: Charles Paget, 6th Marquess of Anglesey, GCVO
1947–1953: ?

Treasurers to the Queen
1910–1919: Honourable Sir Alexander Nelson Hood, KCVO

Ladies of the Bedchamber to the Queen
1910–?: Mabell Ogilvy, Countess of Airlie, GCVO, GBE
1910–27: Lady Mary Forbes-Trefusis

See also
Royal Households of the United Kingdom
Household of Edward VII and Alexandra

References

George V
Royal households
Mary of Teck